was a Japanese track and field athlete. She competed in the women's long jump at the 1956 Summer Olympics.

References

External links
 

1932 births
2022 deaths
Place of birth missing
Japanese female long jumpers
Olympic female long jumpers
Olympic athletes of Japan
Athletes (track and field) at the 1956 Summer Olympics
Asian Games gold medalists for Japan
Asian Games medalists in athletics (track and field)
Athletes (track and field) at the 1954 Asian Games
Medalists at the 1954 Asian Games
Japan Championships in Athletics winners
20th-century Japanese women